Clarendon Municipal Airport  is a city-owned, public-use airport located five nautical miles (6 mi, 9 km) southwest of the central business district of Clarendon, a city in Monroe County, Arkansas, United States. It is included in the National Plan of Integrated Airport Systems for 2011–2015, which categorized it as a general aviation facility.

Facilities and aircraft 
Clarendon Municipal Airport covers an area of 160 acres (65 ha) at an elevation of 217 feet (66 m) above mean sea level. It has one runway designated 18/36 with an asphalt surface measuring 3,200 by 60 feet (975 x 18 m).

For the 12-month period ending August 31, 2012, the airport had 26,500 aircraft operations, an average of 72 per day: 98% general aviation and 2% military. At that time there were four single-engine aircraft based at this airport.

References

External links 
 Clarendon Municipal (4M8) at Arkansas Department of Aeronautics
 Aerial image as of March 1994 from USGS The National Map
 
 

Airports in Arkansas
Transportation in Monroe County, Arkansas
Buildings and structures in Monroe County, Arkansas